Stephensia cunilae is a moth of the family Elachistidae. It is found in the United States, where it has been recorded from Ohio, Kentucky and Indiana.

The wingspan is 6.5–7 mm. The extreme base of the forewings is dark reddish-bronze, while the rest of the wing is dark brown with a bronzy luster. The markings are pale golden. The hindwings are dark grayish brown. Adults are on wing in late June and July and again in September in two generations per year.

The larvae feed on Cunila origanoides. They mine the leaves of their host plant. The mine starts as a narrow gallery, extending towards the tip of the leaf. It later expands into a blotch occupying the outer half of the leaf. All frass is deposited within the mine. The larvae have whitish body with a slight green tinge. The head is black. Pupation takes place outside of the mine in a fold of a leaf beneath a fine, closely woven sheet of silk. Adults of the second generation overwinter.

References

Elachistidae
Moths described in 1930
Moths of North America